Liancheng County is a county in the municipal region of Longyan, Fujian, People's Republic of China.

Geography
Liancheng borders Changting and Shanghang counties to the west and south, and Xinluo, the municipal seat, to the southeast.  Sanming Municipality's Yong'an City and Qingliu County lie to the east and northeast. 
Two watersheds meet here, with most of the county's rivers flowing north and east to the Min River and the East China Sea, and the remainder flowing southwest to the Ting River system and the South China Sea.

Climate

Transportation
Liancheng county is crossed by National Route 205 (Yong'an downtown--Shanghang centre). The 319 (Xinluo downtown--Changting centre) crossing the southwest of the county is for about half its length identical with the 205.  The Ganzhou–Longyan Railway passes through Liancheng.

Administration
The Liancheng County executive, legislature and judiciary is in Lianfeng Town, together with the CPC and PSB branches.

Other towns:
 Beituan (北团镇)
 Gutian (姑田镇)
 Pengkou (朋口镇)
 Juxi (莒溪镇)
With a total population of 18054, Juxi is a beautiful town located in 30 kilometers away from Lianfeng Town. People in Juxi speak local Hakka dialects and Mandarin Chinese. The local dialects are different according to last names. For example, people whose last name is Shen speaks differently with people whose last name is Luo. Another interesting tradition is that people celebrate two days of Dragon Boat Festival and Chongyang Festival also according to last names. People who celebrate at the first day will invite relatives and friends celebrate on the second day to their house, and vice versa. There is a beautiful waterfall in Juxi around by the green mountains.  
 Xinquan
 Miaoqian (庙前镇)

Sights
The Peitian village is 800-year-old, in 2005 it was designated as "National Historical and Cultural Village".

References

 
County-level divisions of Fujian
Longyan